The Oreavu is a left tributary of the river Râmna in Romania. It flows into the Râmna in the village Oreavu.

References

Rivers of Romania
Rivers of Vrancea County